Grosvenor Park may refer to
 Grosvenor Park, Saskatoon, a neighborhood located in east-central Saskatoon, Saskatchewan, Canada
 Grosvenor Park, Belfast, a football ground in Northern Ireland
 Grosvenor Park, Chester, a park in Chester, Cheshire
 Grosvenor Park, a neighborhood located in North Bethesda, Maryland
 Grosvenor Park Productions, a British production and film-financing company